The Noire River (in English: Black River) is a tributary of the Bécancour River which is a tributary of the south shore of the St. Lawrence River. The Noire River flows through the municipalities of Inverness, Laurierville, Plessisville (parish) and Notre-Dame-de-Lourdes, in the L'Érable Regional County Municipality (MRC), in the administrative region of Centre-du-Québec, in Quebec, in Canada.

Geography 

The main neighboring hydrographic slopes of the Black River are:
 north side: Bécancour River;
 east side: Bécancour River;
 south side: McKenzie River, Bécancour River, Gingras waterway;
 west side: Bourbon River, Bécancour River.

Upper course of the river

  north-west, then turn west, up to the municipal limit of Laurierville;
  north-west, then west, to the bridge located south of the village of Laurierville;
  westward, passing south of the village of Laurierville, up to the municipal limit of Plessisville (parish);

Lower course of the river

  north-west, forming a loop to the west and another to the east, to the road;
  north-west, then north, to the municipal limit of Notre-Dame-de-Lourdes;
  northward, to the confluence of the Perdrix River;
  northward, to the confluence of the Barbue River;
  westward, to the route 265 bridge;
  westward, up to its confluence.

Toponymy 
The toponym "rivière Noire" was made official on December 5, 1968, at the Commission de toponymie du Québec.

See also 
 List of rivers of Quebec

References 

Rivers of Centre-du-Québec
L'Érable Regional County Municipality